Warino Lestanto (born 12 November 1952) is an Indonesian weightlifter. He competed in the men's lightweight event at the 1976 Summer Olympics.

References

1952 births
Living people
Indonesian male weightlifters
Olympic weightlifters of Indonesia
Weightlifters at the 1976 Summer Olympics
Place of birth missing (living people)
20th-century Indonesian people